Proteoteras aesculana, the maple twig borer, early proteoteras or maple tip moth, is a moth of the family Tortricidae. It is found from coast to coast in the northern United States, south to Mississippi in the east and to California in the west. It has a scattered distribution in Canada, from Nova Scotia to southern Alberta.

The wingspan is 11–18 mm. Adults are on wing from April to October in the northern United States. In California, adults have been collected as early as February and as late as September, suggesting that there are multiple generations in the San Francisco Bay Area. There is one generation per year in the eastern part of the range.

Larvae have been recorded on boxelder, silver maple, sugar maple and bigleaf maple, but probably also feed on other maple species. The larvae hollow out dormant buds and seeds in fall and continue to feed on dormant buds in spring. During the growing season, larvae bore in fresh shoots, often destroying them and preventing terminal growth. The larvae mix frass (which is ejected from the galleries) with webbing to form shelters around the entrances.

References

External links
Images
Bug Guide
Detailed species info

Eucosmini
Moths of North America
Moths described in 1881